Fly Music was a Spanish  television channel broadcast in Spain by NET TV as a Spanish version of MTV. The channel broadcast a range of music videos and profiles of alternative artists (such as Goldfrapp, Björk, Massive Attack, Hercules & Love Affair, Antony & the Johnsons, MGMT, etc.), throughout the day during named strands. Examples of these strands included Fly Box, Fly Top and D-Club. Many of these programmes featured in-vision presenters. The channel was available through digital terrestrial television and other services. The share of this channel is one of the lowest audience in TDT. With a Share of 45245 people watch.

Due to the low audience share gained by the channel since it was opened, Fly Music was replaced on 30 June 2008 by Disney Channel.

References

External links
Official website

Defunct television channels in Spain
Television channels and stations established in 2005
Television channels and stations disestablished in 2008
Spanish-language television stations